Rafael Díaz de Cabrera (1565 - 30 Sep 1630) was a Roman Catholic prelate who served as Bishop of Mondoñedo (1618–1630).

Biography
Rafael Díaz de Cabrera was born in La Coronada, Spain and ordained a priest in the Order of the Most Holy Trinity. On 6 Aug 1618, he was selected by the King of Spain and confirmed by Pope Paul V as Bishop of Mondoñedo. On 30 Dec 1618, he was consecrated by Fernando Acevedo González, Archbishop of Burgos with Juan Zapata Osorio, Bishop of Zamora, and Francisco Pereira, Bishop of Miranda, serving as co-consecrators. He served as Bishop of Mondoñedo until his death on 30 Sep 1630.

References 

1565 births
1630 deaths
16th-century Roman Catholic bishops in Spain
Bishops appointed by Pope Paul V
Trinitarian bishops